Midway is an unincorporated community in Smyrna Township, Jefferson County, Indiana.

Geography

References

Unincorporated communities in Jefferson County, Indiana
Unincorporated communities in Indiana